The 2021 FIFA Arab Cup is an international football tournament held in Qatar from 30 November to 18 December 2021. The 16 national teams involved in the tournament are required to register a squad of 23 players, including three goalkeepers, selected from an initial provisional list of 35 players. Only players in these squads are eligible to take part in the tournament.

The position listed for each player is per the official squad list published by FIFA. The age listed for each player is on 30 November 2021, the first day of the tournament. The numbers of caps and goals listed for each player do not include any matches played after the start of the tournament. The club listed is the club for which the player last played a competitive match prior to the tournament. The nationality for each club reflects the national association (not the league) to which the club is affiliated. A flag is included for coaches who are of a different nationality than their own national team.

Group A

Bahrain
Bahrain's final squad was announced on 21 November 2021.

Coach:  Hélio Sousa

Iraq
Iraq's final squad was announced on 20 November 2021. Ibrahim Bayesh and Mohammed Ali Abbood withdrew injured and were replaced by Yaser Kasim and Hussein Ammar on 25 November.

Coach:  Željko Petrović

Oman
Oman's final squad was announced on 18 November 2021.

Coach:  Branko Ivanković

Qatar
Qatar's final squad was announced on 19 November 2021.

Coach:  Félix Sánchez

Group B

Mauritania
Mauritania's final squad was announced on 19 November 2021.

Coach:  Didier Gomes Da Rosa

Syria
Syria's final squad was announced on 19 November 2021.

Coach:  Valeriu Tița

Tunisia
Tunisia's final squad was announced on 19 November 2021. Aymen Abdennour withdrew injured and was replaced by Jasser Khmiri on 28 November. Anis Ben Slimane withdrew and was replaced by Mootez Zaddem on 29 November.

Coach: Mondher Kebaier

United Arab Emirates
The United Arab Emirates' final squad was announced on 22 November 2021.

Coach:  Bert van Marwijk

Group C

Jordan
Jordan's final squad was announced on 26 November 2021. On 30 November 2021, Sharara replaced Anas Hammad, who tested positive for COVID-19 four days after being named in the squad.

Coach:  Adnan Hamad

Morocco
Morocco's squad was announced on 19 November 2021.

Coach: Hussein Ammouta

Palestine
Palestine's final squad was announced on 18 November 2021.

Coach:  Makram Daboub

Saudi Arabia
Saudi Arabia's final squad was announced on 18 November 2021. Ziyad Al-Johani withdrew injured and was replaced by Abdullah Radif on 27 November.

Coach:  Laurent Bonadéi

Group D

Algeria
Algeria's final squad was announced on 19 November 2021. Mehdi Abeid withdrew injured and was replaced by Yacine Titraoui on 27 November.

Coach: Madjid Bougherra

Egypt
Egypt's final squad was announced on 20 November 2021. On 27 November 2021, Ahmed Hegazi replaced Emam Ashour, who tested positive for COVID-19 three days after being named in the squad.

Coach:  Carlos Queiroz

Lebanon
Lebanon's final squad was announced on 23 November 2021. Ali Daher and Mohamad Kdouh withdrew injured and were replaced by Antoine Al Douaihy and Hussein Awada on 28 November.

Coach:  Ivan Hašek

Sudan
Sudan's final squad was announced on 19 November 2021.

Coach:  Hubert Velud

Statistics

Age

Players
Oldest:  Moataz Yaseen
Youngest:  Yacine Titraoui

Goalkeepers
Oldest:  Moataz Yaseen
Youngest:  Ibrahim Al-Rajhi

Captains
Oldest:  Moataz Yaseen
Youngest:  Saud Abdulhamid

Player representation by league system
League systems with 20 or more players represented are listed. In all, FIFA Arab Cup squad members played for clubs in 29 countries from 4 confederations.

 The Qatar, United Arab Emirates and Saudi Arabia squads were made up entirely of players from the countries' respective domestic leagues.
 The Syria squad had the most players from a single foreign federation, with seven players employed in Bahrain.
 Of the Arab countries not represented by a national team at the FIFA Arab Cup, Libya's leagues provided the most squad members, with just three, while the top non-Arab country to provide players was Sweden with four.
 The Algeria squad had the least players playing in domestic leagues, with eight players only playing in Algeria.
 Three players were not attached to a club prior to the start of the tournament (Mauritania's Harouna Abou Demba and Adama Ba, and Palestine's Yaser Hamed).

Coaches representation by country
Coaches in bold represented their own country.

Notes

References

External links
 Official squad lists

Squads
2021